Aspasia variegata is a species of orchid widespread across much of northern South America as well as Trinidad and the Amazonian region.

Aspasia variegata is found in open forests both in dry and flooded lands, then often on branches of the trees hanging over the waters.

References

External links 

variegata
Flora of the Amazon
Orchids of Bolivia
Orchids of Brazil
Orchids of Colombia
Orchids of Venezuela
Flora of Trinidad and Tobago
Orchids of French Guiana
Orchids of Suriname
Orchids of Guyana
Plants described in 1836
Flora without expected TNC conservation status